Oreshak is a village, situated in the middle part of the Balkan Mountains in Troyan Municipality, Lovech Province, Bulgaria. There is a famous ethnographic complex very close to the Troyan Monastery — one of the biggest monasteries in Bulgaria. In 2005, the village had a population of 2,306 (2007). The late Bulgarian Patriarch Maxim was born there on October 29, 1914, and was buried there after his death in November 2012.

Villages in Lovech Province